Brian Adam Burg (born February 4, 1980) is an American basketball coach who most recently served as head coach of the Georgia Southern Eagles men's basketball team.

Early life and education
Burg is a native of Katy, Texas and is the son of Jim Burg. He played basketball at Cisco College before transferring to Mount Mercy University. When he was in college, Burg wrote letters to Bob Knight to try to find a coaching job. Burg graduated from Mount Mercy in 2003. He earned his master's degree from Lake Erie College in 2005.

Coaching career
Burg began his coaching career as a graduate assistant at Lake Erie College from 2003 to 2005. He was an assistant coach at Garden City Community College from 2005 to 2006 and at Western Texas College from 2006 to 2007. Between 2007 and 2009 Burg served as the Director of Basketball Operations under Kermit Davis at Middle Tennessee State and was responsible for overseeing student-athlete academics, video editing and community. In 2009, Burg became an assistant coach at Campbell. He helped the team win the 2010 Atlantic Sun Conference regular season title and was the lead recruiter for Eric Griffin, the program's first NBA player. Burg served as an assistant at North Carolina Central from 2013 to 2015 and helped the team go to the 2014 NCAA Tournament and 2015 NIT. In 2015, Burg joined Little Rock as an assistant under Chris Beard and helped the team finish 30-5 and win a game in the NCAA Tournament. Burg followed Beard to Texas Tech in 2016 where he became the chief of staff. Burg became an assistant at Texas Tech in 2018 and led the team to the 2019 NCAA Tournament Championship Game.

On March 29, 2020, Burg was hired as the head coach at Georgia Southern. He replaces Mark Byington, who left to take the job at James Madison, and is athletic director Jared Benko's first hire.

Head coaching record

References

External links
Twitter

1980 births
Living people
American men's basketball coaches
Basketball coaches from Texas
Basketball players from Texas
Georgia Southern Eagles men's basketball coaches
NC State Wolfpack men's basketball coaches
Texas Tech Red Raiders basketball coaches
Little Rock Trojans men's basketball coaches
North Carolina Central Eagles men's basketball coaches
Campbell Fighting Camels basketball coaches
Middle Tennessee Blue Raiders men's basketball coaches
Mount Mercy University alumni
People from Katy, Texas
Sportspeople from Harris County, Texas